Joseph Hooker (November 13, 1814 – October 31, 1879) was an American Civil War general for the Union, chiefly remembered for his decisive defeat by Confederate General Robert E. Lee at the Battle of Chancellorsville in 1863.

Hooker had served in the Seminole Wars and the Mexican–American War, receiving three brevet promotions, before resigning from the Army. At the start of the Civil War, he joined the Union side as a brigadier general, distinguishing himself at Williamsburg, Antietam and Fredericksburg, after which he was given command of the Army of the Potomac.

His ambitious plan for Chancellorsville was thwarted by Lee's bold move in dividing his army and routing a Union corps, as well as by mistakes on the part of Hooker's subordinate generals and his own loss of nerve. The defeat handed Lee the initiative, which allowed him to travel north to Gettysburg. 

Hooker was kept in command, but when General Halleck and Lincoln declined his request for reinforcements, he resigned. George G. Meade was appointed to command the Army of the Potomac three days before Gettysburg.
Hooker returned to combat in November 1863, helping to relieve the besieged Union Army at Chattanooga, Tennessee, and continuing in the Western Theater under Maj. Gen. William T. Sherman, but departed in protest before the end of the Atlanta Campaign when he was passed over for promotion.

Hooker became known as "Fighting Joe" following a journalist's clerical error, and the nickname stuck. His personal reputation was as a hard-drinking ladies' man, and his headquarters were known for parties and gambling.

Early years
Hooker was born in Hadley, Massachusetts, the grandson of a captain in the American Revolutionary War. He was of entirely English ancestry, all of whom had been in New England since the early 1600s. His initial schooling was at the local Hopkins Academy. He graduated from the United States Military Academy in 1837, ranked 29th out of a class of 50, and was commissioned a second lieutenant in the 1st U.S. Artillery. His initial assignment was in Florida fighting in the second of the Seminole Wars. He served in the Mexican–American War in staff positions in the campaigns of both Zachary Taylor and Winfield Scott. He received brevet promotions for his staff leadership and gallantry in three battles: Monterrey (to captain), National Bridge (major), and Chapultepec (lieutenant colonel). His future Army reputation as a ladies' man began in Mexico, where local women referred to him as the "Handsome Captain".

After the Mexican–American War (which ended in 1848), he served as an assistant adjutant general of the Pacific Division, but resigned his commission in 1853; his military reputation had been damaged when he testified against his former commander, General Scott, in the court-martial for insubordination of Gideon Johnson Pillow.  Hooker struggled with the tedium of peacetime life and reportedly passed the time with liquor, ladies, and gambling. He settled in Sonoma County, California, as a farmer and land developer, and ran unsuccessfully for election to represent the region in the California legislature. He was obviously unhappy and unsuccessful in his civilian pursuits because, in 1858, he wrote to Secretary of War John B. Floyd to request that his name "be presented to the president Buchanan as a candidate for a lieutenant colonelcy", but nothing came of his request. From 1859 to 1861, he held a commission as a colonel in the California militia.

Civil War
At the start of the Civil War in 1861, Hooker requested a commission, but his first application was rejected, possibly because of the lingering resentment harbored by Winfield Scott, general-in-chief of the Army. He had to borrow money to make the trip east from California. After he witnessed the Union Army defeat at the First Battle of Bull Run, he wrote a letter to President Abraham Lincoln that complained of military mismanagement, promoted his own qualifications, and again requested a commission. He was appointed, in August 1861, as brigadier general of volunteers to rank from May 17. He commanded a brigade and then division around Washington, D.C., as part of the effort to organize and train the new Army of the Potomac, under Maj. Gen. George B. McClellan.

1862

In the Peninsula Campaign of 1862, Hooker commanded the 2nd Division of the III Corps and made a good name for himself as a combat leader who handled himself well and aggressively sought out the key points on battlefields. He led his division with distinction at Williamsburg and at Seven Pines. Hooker's division did not play a major role in the Seven Days Battles, although he and fellow division commander Phil Kearny tried unsuccessfully to urge McClellan to counterattack the Confederates. He chafed at the cautious generalship of McClellan and openly criticized his failure to capture Richmond. Of his commander, Hooker said, "He is not only not a soldier, but he does not know what soldiership is." The Peninsula cemented two further reputations of Hooker's: his devotion to the welfare and morale of his men,  and his hard-drinking social life, even on the battlefield.

On July 26, Hooker was promoted to major general, ranked from May 5. During the Second Battle of Bull Run, the III Corps was sent to reinforce John Pope's Army of Virginia. Following Second Bull Run, Hooker replaced Irvin McDowell as commander of the Army of Virginia's III Corps, which soon redesignated the I Corps of the Army of the Potomac. During the Maryland Campaign, Hooker led the I Corps at South Mountain and at Antietam, his corps launched the first assault of the bloodiest day in American history, driving south into the corps of Lt. Gen. Stonewall Jackson, where they fought each other to a standstill. Hooker, aggressive and inspiring to his men, left the battle early in the morning with a foot wound. He asserted that the battle would have been a decisive Union victory if he had managed to stay on the field, but General McClellan's caution once again failed the Northern troops and Lee's much smaller army eluded destruction. With his patience at an end, President Lincoln replaced McClellan with Maj. Gen. Ambrose Burnside. Although Hooker had criticized McClellan persistently, the latter was apparently unaware of it and in early October, shortly before his termination, had recommended that Hooker receive a promotion to brigadier general in the regular army. The War Department promptly acted on this recommendation, and Hooker received his brigadier's commission to rank from September 20. This promotion ensured that he would remain a general after the war was over and not revert to the rank of captain or lieutenant colonel.

December 1862 Battle of Fredericksburg was another Union debacle. Upon recovering from his foot wound, Hooker was briefly made commander of V Corps but was then promoted to "Grand Division" command, with a command that consisted of both III and V Corps. Hooker derided Burnside's plan to assault the fortified heights behind the city, deeming them "preposterous". His Grand Division (particularly V Corps) suffered serious losses in fourteen futile assaults ordered by Burnside over Hooker's protests. Burnside followed up this battle with the humiliating Mud March in January and Hooker's criticism of his commander bordered on formal insubordination. He described Burnside as a "wretch ... of blundering sacrifice." Burnside planned a wholesale purge of his subordinates, including Hooker, and drafted an order for the president's approval. He stated that Hooker was "unfit to hold an important commission during a crisis like the present." But Lincoln's patience had again run out and he removed Burnside instead.

Army of the Potomac

Lincoln appointed Hooker to command of the Army of the Potomac on January 26, 1863. Some members of the army saw this move as inevitable, given Hooker's reputation for aggressive fighting, something sorely lacking in his predecessors. During the "Mud March" Hooker was quoted by a New York Times army correspondent as saying that "Nothing would go right until we had a dictator, and the sooner the better." Lincoln wrote a letter to the newly appointed general, part of which stated,

During the spring of 1863, Hooker established a reputation as an outstanding administrator and restored the morale of his soldiers, which had plummeted to a new low under Burnside. Among his changes were fixes to the daily diet of the troops, camp sanitary changes, improvements and accountability of the quartermaster system, addition of and monitoring of company cooks, several hospital reforms, and an improved furlough system (one man per company by turn, 10 days each). He created the Bureau of Military Information, which was the first all-source intelligence organization employed by the U.S. military.  He also implemented corps badges as a means of identifying units during battle or when marching and to instill unit pride in the men. Other orders addressed the need to stem rising desertion (one from Lincoln combined with incoming mail review, the ability to shoot deserters, and better camp picket lines), more and better drills, stronger officer training, and for the first time, combining the federal cavalry into a single corps. The corps badge idea was suggested by Hooker's chief of staff, Daniel Butterfield (Sears, Chancellorsville, p. 72).</ref> Hooker said of his revived army:

Also during this winter, Hooker made several high-level command changes, including with his corps commanders. Both "Left Grand Division" commander Maj. Gen. William B. Franklin, who vowed that he would not serve under Hooker, and II Corps commander Maj. Gen. Edwin Vose Sumner was relieved of command, on Burnside's recommendation, in the same order appointing Hooker to command. The IX Corps was a potential source of embarrassment or friction within the army because it was Burnside's old corps, so it was detached as a separate organization and sent to the Virginia Peninsula under the command of Brig. Gen. William F. "Baldy" Smith, former commander of VI Corps. (Both Franklin and Smith were considered suspect by Hooker because of their previous political maneuvering against Burnside and on behalf of McClellan.)

For the important position of chief of staff, Hooker asked the War Department to send him Brig. Gen. Charles Stone, however, this was denied. Stone had been relieved, arrested, and imprisoned for his role in the Battle of Ball's Bluff in the fall of 1861, despite the lack of any trial. Stone did not receive a command upon his release, mostly due to political pressures, which left him militarily exiled and disgraced. Army of the Potomac historian and author Bruce Catton termed this request by Hooker "a strange and seemingly uncharacteristic thing" and "one of the most interesting things he ever did." Hooker never explained why he asked for Stone, but Catton believed:

Despite this, Fighting Joe would set a very bad example for the conduct of generals and their staff and subordinates. His headquarters in Falmouth, Virginia, was described by cavalry officer Charles F. Adams, Jr., as being a combination of a "bar-room and a brothel". He built a network of loyal political cronies that included Maj. Gen. Dan Butterfield for chief of staff, and the notorious political general, Maj. Gen. Daniel E. Sickles, for command of the III Corps.

Chancellorsville

Hooker's plan for the spring and summer campaign was both elegant and promising. He first planned to send his cavalry corps deep into the enemy's rear, disrupting supply lines and distracting him from the main attack. He would pin down Robert E. Lee's much smaller army at Fredericksburg while taking the large bulk of the Army of the Potomac on a flanking march to strike Lee in his rear. Defeating Lee, he could move on to seize Richmond. Unfortunately for Hooker and the Union, the execution of his plan did not match the elegance of the plan itself. The cavalry raid was conducted cautiously by its commander, Brig. Gen. George Stoneman, and met none of its objectives. The flanking march went well enough, achieving strategic surprise, but when he attempted to advance with three columns, Stonewall Jackson's surprise attack on May 1 pushed Hooker back and caused him to withdraw his troops. From there, Hooker pulled his army back to Chancellorsville and waited for Lee to attack. Lee audaciously split his smaller army in two to deal with both parts of Hooker's army. Then, he split again, sending Stonewall Jackson's corps on its own flanking march, striking Hooker's exposed right flank and routing the Union XI Corps. The Army of the Potomac dropped into a purely defensive mode and eventually was forced to retreat.

The Battle of Chancellorsville has been called "Lee's perfect battle" because of his ability to vanquish a much larger foe through audacious tactics. Part of Hooker's failure can be attributed to an encounter with a cannonball; while he was standing on the porch of his headquarters, the missile struck a wooden column against which he was leaning, initially knocking him senseless, and then putting him out of action for the rest of the day with a concussion. Despite his incapacitation, he refused entreaties to turn over temporary command of the army to his second-in-command, Maj. Gen. Darius N. Couch. Several of his subordinate generals, including Couch and Maj. Gen. Henry W. Slocum, openly questioned Hooker's command decisions. Couch was so disgusted that he refused to ever serve under Hooker again. Political winds blew strongly in the following weeks as generals maneuvered to overthrow Hooker or to position themselves if Lincoln decided on his own to do so.

Robert E. Lee once again began an invasion of the North, in June 1863, and Lincoln urged Hooker to pursue and defeat him. Hooker's initial plan was to seize Richmond instead, but Lincoln immediately vetoed that idea, so the Army of the Potomac began to march north, attempting to locate Lee's Army of Northern Virginia as it slipped down the Shenandoah Valley into Pennsylvania. Hooker's mission was first to protect Washington, D.C., and Baltimore and second to intercept and defeat Lee. Unfortunately, Lincoln was losing any remaining confidence he had in Hooker. Hooker's senior officers expressed to Lincoln their lack of confidence in Hooker, as did Henry Halleck, Lincoln's General-in-chief. When Hooker got into a dispute with Army headquarters over the status of defensive forces in Harpers Ferry, he impulsively offered his resignation in protest, which was quickly accepted by Lincoln and General-in-chief Henry W. Halleck. On June 28, 1863, three days before the climactic Battle of Gettysburg, Hooker was replaced by Maj. Gen. George Meade. Hooker received the Thanks of Congress for his role at the start of the Gettysburg Campaign, but the glory would go to Meade. Hooker's tenure as head of the Army of the Potomac had lasted 5 months.

Western Theater

Hooker's military career was not ended by his poor performance in the summer of 1863. He went on to regain a reputation as a solid corps commander when he was transferred with the XI and XII Corps of the Army of the Potomac westward to reinforce the Army of the Cumberland around Chattanooga, Tennessee. Hooker was in command at the Battle of Lookout Mountain, playing an important role in Lt. Gen. Ulysses S. Grant's decisive victory at the Battle of Chattanooga. He was brevetted to major general in the regular army for his success at Chattanooga, but he was disappointed to find that Grant's official report of the battle credited his friend William Tecumseh Sherman's contribution over Hooker's.

Hooker led his corps (now designated the XX Corps) competently in 1864 Atlanta Campaign under Sherman but asked to be relieved before the capture of the city because of his dissatisfaction with the promotion of Maj. Gen. Oliver O. Howard to the command of the Army of the Tennessee, upon the death of Maj. Gen. James B. McPherson. Not only did Hooker have seniority over Howard, but he also blamed Howard in large part for his defeat at Chancellorsville (Howard had commanded the XI Corps, which had borne the brunt of Jackson's flank attack). Hooker's biographer reports that there were numerous stories indicating that Abraham Lincoln attempted to intercede with Sherman, urging that Hooker be appointed to command the Army of Tennessee, but Sherman threatened to resign if the president insisted. However, due to "obvious gaps" in the Official Records, the story cannot be verified.

After leaving Georgia, Hooker commanded the Northern Department (comprising the states of Michigan, Ohio, Indiana, and Illinois), headquartered in Cincinnati, Ohio, from October 1, 1864, until the end of the war. While in Cincinnati he married Olivia Groesbeck, sister of Congressman William S. Groesbeck.

Final years

After the war, Hooker led Lincoln's funeral procession in Springfield on May 4, 1865. He served in command of the Department of the East and Department of the Lakes following the war. His postbellum life was marred by poor health and he was partially paralyzed by a stroke. He was mustered out of the volunteer service on September 1, 1866, and retired from the U.S. Army on October 15, 1868, with the regular army rank of major general. He died on October 31, 1879, while on a visit to Garden City, New York, and is buried in Spring Grove Cemetery, Cincinnati, Ohio, his wife's hometown.

Legacy
Hooker was popularly known as "Fighting Joe" Hooker, a nickname he regretted deeply; he said, "People will think I am a highwayman or a bandit." When a newspaper dispatch arrived in New York during the Peninsula Campaign, a typographical error changed the entry "Fighting – Joe Hooker Attacks Rebels" to remove the dash and the name stuck. Robert E. Lee occasionally referred to him as "Mr. F. J. Hooker" in a mildly sarcastic jab at his opponent.

Hooker's reputation as a hard-drinking ladies' man was established through rumors in the pre-Civil War Army and has been cited by a number of popular histories. Biographer Walter H. Hebert describes the general's personal habits as the "subject of much debate" although there was little debate in the popular opinion of the time. His men parodied Hooker in the popular war song Marching Along. The lines

were replaced by

Historian Stephen W. Sears, however, states that there is no basis for the claims that Hooker was a heavy drinker or that he was ever intoxicated on the battlefield.

There is a popular legend that "hooker" as a slang term for a prostitute is derived from his last name because of parties and a lack of military discipline at his headquarters near the Murder Bay district of Washington, DC. Some versions of the legend claim that the band of prostitutes that followed his division was derisively referred to as "General Hooker's Army" or "Hooker's Brigade." However, the term "hooker" was used in print as early as 1845, years before Hooker was a public figure, and is likely derived from the concentration of prostitutes around the shipyards and ferry terminal of the Corlear's Hook area of Manhattan in the early to middle 19th century, who came to be referred to as "hookers". The prevalence of the Hooker legend may have been at least partly responsible for the popularity of the term. There is some evidence that an area in Washington, DC, known for prostitution during the Civil War, was referred to as "Hooker's Division". The name was shortened to "The Division" when he spent time there after First Bull Run guarding D.C. against incursion.

There is an equestrian statue of General Hooker outside the Massachusetts State House in Boston, and Hooker County in Nebraska is named for him.

See also

 List of American Civil War generals (Union)
 List of Massachusetts generals in the American Civil War
 Massachusetts in the American Civil War

References
Specific

 Bibliography
 Barnett, James. Forty For the Union: Civil War Generals Buried in Spring Grove Cemetery. (Cincinnati Civil War Roundtable biography of Hooker).
 Catton, Bruce. Glory Road. Garden City, NY: Doubleday and Company, 1952. .
 Eicher, John H., and David J. Eicher. Civil War High Commands. Stanford, CA: Stanford University Press, 2001. .
 Foote, Shelby. The Civil War: A Narrative. Vol. 2, Fredericksburg to Meridian. New York: Random House, 1958. .
 Hebert, Walter H. Fighting Joe Hooker. Lincoln: University of Nebraska Press, 1999. .
 Johnson, Robert Underwood, and Clarence C. Buel, eds. Battles and Leaders of the Civil War. 4 vols. New York: Century Co., 1884–1888. .
 Lincoln, Abraham. Letter to General Hooker, January 26, 1863.
 Sears, Stephen W. Chancellorsville. Boston: Houghton Mifflin, 1996. .
 Sears, Stephen W. To the Gates of Richmond: The Peninsula Campaign. Ticknor and Fields, 1992. .
 Smith, Gene. "The Destruction of Fighting Joe Hooker." American Heritage, October 1993.
 Tsouras, Peter G. Major General George H. Sharpe and the Creation of American Military Intelligence in the Civil War. Casemate, 2018. .
 Warner, Ezra J. Generals in Blue: Lives of the Union Commanders. Baton Rouge: Louisiana State University Press, 1964. .

External links

 "Fighting Joe" Hooker Biography and timeline
 Joseph Hooker in Encyclopedia Virginia
 Hooker biography on Civil War Home
 Joseph Hooker Home Page and Photo Gallery
 Hooker article from the California State Military Museum
 General Joseph Hooker House in Sonoma, California
 Timeline of Hooker's life, Sonoma League
 Letter to Major General Joseph Hooker from President Abraham Lincoln, January 26, 1863
 

1814 births
1879 deaths
People from Hadley, Massachusetts
American Unitarians
American people of English descent
Union Army generals
People of Massachusetts in the American Civil War
People from Long Island
American military personnel of the Mexican–American War
Members of the Aztec Club of 1847
United States Military Academy alumni
Burials at Spring Grove Cemetery
History of Sonoma County, California
By:[insert name]